Bruceton is a town in Carroll County, Tennessee, United States. The population was 1,478 in the 2010 census.

Bruceton and neighboring town Hollow Rock share a school district the Hollow Rock-Bruceton Special School District.

Geography

Demographics

As of the census of 2000, there were 1554 people and 640 households in the town. The racial makeup of the town was 94.14% White, 4.36% African American, 0.06% Native American, 0.13% Asian, 0.13% from other races, and 0.90% from two or more races. Hispanic or Latino of any race were 0.32% of the population.

There were 640 households, out of which 27.8% had children under the age of 18 living with them, 51.7% were married couples living together, 13.0% had a female householder with no husband present, and 32.2% were non-families. 31.1% of all households were made up of individuals, and 15.8% had someone living alone who was 65 years of age or older. The average household size was 2.25 and the average family size was 2.78.

In the town, the population was spread out, with 21.3% under the age of 18, 7.7% from 18 to 24, 22.6% from 25 to 44, 24.0% from 45 to 64, and 24.4% who were 65 years of age or older. The median age was 44 years. For every 100 females, there were 82.0 males. For every 100 females age 18 and over, there were 80.1 males.

The median income for a household in the town was $28,409, and the median income for a family was $36,176. Males had a median income of $31,146 versus $19,323 for females. The per capita income for the town was $15,711. About 17.4% of families and 16.2% of the population were below the poverty line, including 18.6% of those under age 18 and 13.6% of those age 65 or over.

Media

Radio stations
WRQR-FM 105.5  "Today's Best Music with Ace & TJ in the Morning"
WTPR-AM 710 "The Greatest Hits of All Time"
WTPR-FM 101.7 "The Greatest Hits of All Time"

Newspaper
The Carroll County News-Leader

Notable person 
Patrick Willis – former NFL linebacker for the San Francisco 49ers

Culture 
With a once-thriving textile and railroad economy now firmly in the past, Bruceton has become something of a ghost town struggling to maintain an identity as a community. The town was named after William P. Bruce, a VP of the N.C. & St. Louis Railroad, who determined the railroad route would run through the town.

References

External links

Bruceton — Carroll County Chamber of Commerce page
Town charter

Towns in Carroll County, Tennessee
Towns in Tennessee